MS Berge Stahl was a bulk carrier. Until the delivery of MS Vale Brasil in 2011 she was the longest and largest iron ore carrier in the world. She was registered in Comoros. Before that, she was registered in Douglas, Isle of Man, Stavanger, Norway as well as in Monrovia, Liberia.

She was built in 1986 by Hyundai Heavy Industries.

Because of its massive size, Berge Stahl could originally only tie up, fully loaded, at two ports in the world, hauling ore from the Terminal Marítimo de Ponta da Madeira in Brazil to the Europoort near Rotterdam in the Netherlands. Even at these ports, passage must be timed to coincide with high tides to prevent the ship running aground. Berge Stahl made this trip about ten times each year, or a round-trip about every five weeks.

The newly opened deep-water iron ore wharf at Caofeidian in China received the fully loaded Berge Stahl in October 2011, and several other Chinese ports have since opened to receive Vale's even larger Valemax ships. Berge Stahl can operate from other ports if not fully loaded. In September 2006, the ship carried ore to the port of Majishan, China. On the return voyage to Rotterdam, the ship picked up a partial load of ore in Dampier, Western Australia, and Saldanha Bay in South Africa (where the maximum draft permitted is 21 m). In April 2014, the Berge Stahl received her last dry-docking, in Portugal. The owner, Berge Bulk, announced that the thirty-year-old vessel performed her last voyage to Rotterdam in the autumn of 2016. She was then headed for dry dock, where she was refitted before commencing a new contract transporting iron ore from the Port of Tubarão in Brazil to Sohar, Oman.

In July 2021 the ship was beached at Gadani ship-breaking yard and scrapped.

See also 
List of longest ships
TI-class supertanker

References

External links

 Technical information and image gallery aukevisser.nl 
Image of MS Berge Stahl in port

Merchant ships of Norway
BW Group
1986 ships
Ships built by Hyundai Heavy Industries Group
Very large ore carriers